Tecknens rike (lit. The Empire of Signs) is a 1989 book by Swedish author and sinologist Cecilia Lindqvist about the history of Chinese language writing. It won the August Prize in 1989.

References

1989 novels
Swedish non-fiction books
August Prize-winning works
Albert Bonniers Förlag books